Gonojana magnifica is a moth in the family Eupterotidae. It was described by Rothschild in 1917. It is found in Nigeria.

The wingspan about 67 mm. The forewings are thinly scaled purplish chocolate with a whitish streak on the discocellulars and a darker postmedian line inside of which are varying clouded areas of whitish scales. The hindwings are orange-rufous, with the outer one-third purplish chocolate.

References

Endemic fauna of Nigeria
Moths described in 1917
Janinae